Martin is a small village and civil parish in the North Kesteven district of Lincolnshire, England. The population at the 2011 census was 866. The village of Timberland is just to the south.

The village is on the western edge of the fen through which the River Witham runs. Martin Moor is a drained area to the east of the village, where there is a golf course and a koi carp farm.

Martin has a primary school and a church. The public house is the Royal Oak. The village shop also serves as the post office.

History
The name Martin is Old English mere+tun for "farmstead near a pool". In the 12th century, the village name is recorded as Martona. It is also often listed as Merton in older records, reflecting Old English origins of the name. The Fynes family, a cadet branch of the Earls of Lincoln, were seated at White Hall, or Martin Grange, until the 18th century.

References

External links 

 for Martin, Lincolnshire

Villages in Lincolnshire
Civil parishes in Lincolnshire
North Kesteven District